Parinoberyx horridus is a species of marine slimehead only known from the Western Pacific and the Coral Sea at depths around .  This species is the only known member of its genus.

References

Trachichthyidae
Fish described in 1984